Noo Saro-Wiwa is a British-Nigerian author, noted for her travel writing. She is the daughter of Nigerian activist Ken Saro-Wiwa.

Education
Noo Saro-Wiwa was born in Port Harcourt, Nigeria, and grew up in Ewell, Surrey in England. She attended Roedean School, King's College London and Columbia University, New York, and currently lives in London.

Writing
Saro-Wiwa's first book was Looking for Transwonderland: Travels in Nigeria (Granta Books, 2012). It was nominated for the Dolman Best Travel Book Award, and was named the Sunday Times Travel Book of the Year in 2012. It was selected as BBC Radio 4's Book of the Week in 2012, and was nominated by the Financial Times as one of the best travel books of 2012. The Guardian newspaper also included it among its 10 Best Contemporary Books on Africa in 2012. It has been translated into French and Italian. In 2016 it won the Albatros Travel Literature Prize in Italy.

In 2016, she contributed to the anthology An Unreliable Guide to London (Influx Press), as well as A Country of Refuge (Unbound), an anthology of writing on asylum seekers. Another of her stories also featured in La Felicità Degli Uomini Semplici (66th and 2nd), an Italian-language anthology based around football.

She has contributed book reviews, travel, analysis and opinion articles for The Guardian, The Independent, The Financial Times, The Times Literary Supplement, City AM, La Repubblica, Prospect and The New York Times.

Condé Nast Traveller magazine named Saro-Wiwa as one of the "30 Most Influential Female Travellers" in 2018.

She is a contributor to the 2019 anthology New Daughters of Africa, edited by Margaret Busby.

She narrated the BBC documentary Silence Would Be Treason, broadcast 15 January 2022. The documentary includes letters sent by Ken Saro-Wiwa to the Irish nun, Sister Majella McCarron.

Personal life
Noo Saro-Wiwa is the daughter of the Nigerian poet and environmental activist Ken Saro-Wiwa, and her twin sister is video artist and filmmaker Zina Saro-Wiwa.

Bibliography
 Looking for Transwonderland: Travels in Nigeria (Granta Books, 2012).

Selected articles
 "The unexpected consequence of gorilla conservation in Uganda", City A.M., 11 December 2019.
 "Phoebe Waller-Bridge on the creation of Fleabag" 
 "Swimming With Sharks: Hillary and Chelsea Clinton discuss their new book, Gutsy Women"
 "Working-class heroine: Noo Saro-Wiwa shares insights and advice from Michelle Obama", TLS, 6 December 2018.
 "A land of conquest, casinos and copious wine, Georgia", City A.M., 5 July 2018.
 "What's in a name? Well, the right letters would help", The Guardian, 12 February 2015.
 "Boko Haram: Why selfies won't 'bring back our girls'", Prospect, 20 May 2014.
 "Bombastic, monochrome and simplistic – and yet still I love Top Gun", The Guardian, 16 May 2016.

See Also 

 Ken Saro-Wiwa
Ken Wiwa
Zina Saro-Wiwa

References

External links

Noo Saro-Wiwa at The Guardian

1976 births
21st-century British women writers
21st-century British writers
21st-century Nigerian women writers
21st-century Nigerian writers
British travel writers
British women travel writers
Journalists from Rivers State
Living people
Nigerian emigrants to the United Kingdom
Nigerian twins
Ogoni people
Wiwa family
Writers from Port Harcourt